Aleksandar Yovchev (born 27 October 1996) is a Bulgarian footballer who plays as a defender for Spartak Varna.

Career
In January 2014, Yovchev was included in Cherno More's 25-man squad for their training camp in Turkey. Aleksandar made his first team début in a 2–2 away draw against Slavia (Bulgarian Cup 1/8 final) on 3 December 2014.  He made his full league début in a 1–2 home defeat against Lokomotiv Plovdiv on 26 May 2015, playing as left back.

On 17 January 2018 Yovchev returned his hometown to play for Spartak Varna.

Career statistics

References

External links
 

1996 births
Living people
Bulgarian footballers
Association football defenders
PFC Cherno More Varna players
PFC Dobrudzha Dobrich players
PFC Spartak Varna players
First Professional Football League (Bulgaria) players